Indirect parliamentary elections were held in Rwanda in 1954.

Electoral system
The Decree of 14 July 1952 by the Belgian authorities introduced an element of democracy to the Rwandan political system. A complicated electoral system was created, which involved seven stages of elections to eventually elect the national Superior Council.

Results
The elections in the sub-chiefdoms and chiefdoms were held in 1953, with the elections to the Territorial Councils and the Superior Council following in 1954.

References

1954 elections in Africa
1954 in Rwanda
1954